Esteban González Burchard is an American physician-scientist, a distinguished professor in the School of Pharmacy at University of California at San Francisco,a specialist in gene-environment interactions in asthma and health disparities.

Education and early life 
Esteban Gonzalez Burchard received his M.D. at Stanford University School of Medicine in 1995. He completed his internship and residency in internal medicine at Harvard's Brigham and Women’s Hospital. He completed his specialty training in Pulmonary/Critical Care Medicine at the University of California, San Francisco, and clinical research from the Harvard School of Public Health. Esteban Gonzalez Burchard earned his master’s in public health in epidemiology from University of California, Berkeley in 2006.

Career 
Burchard is a distinguished professor in the School of Pharmacy at UCSF, after beginning his career there in 2001.

Burchard studies gene-environment interactions in asthma, especially in children, and health disparities in the US. As part of this work, he founded and directs the largest study of asthma in minority children in the United States, called the Asthma Translational Genomics Collaborative. This study involves whole genome sequencing of more than 15,000 people. He is involved in the All of Us Initiative at the US National Institutes of Health. He uses his personal experience as a Mexican-American scientist to enhance his research.

Awards, honors, and major lectures 

 Harry Wm. and Diana V. Hind Distinguished Professor in Pharmaceutical Sciences, UCSF, 2013
 Member, Precision Medicine Initiative Working Group of the Advisory Committee to the NIH Director, 2015
 Lifetime Achievement Award, National Medical Association (NMA), Allergy and Immunology Section, 2018

References 

San Francisco State University alumni
Stanford University School of Medicine alumni
University of California, San Francisco faculty
University of California, Berkeley alumni
21st-century American physicians
American people of Mexican descent
Year of birth missing (living people)
Living people